Centro, or Downtown, is the historic center of Puerto Vallarta, in the Mexican state of Jalisco.

The district is north of Zona Romántica and the Cuale River, and south of 5 de Diciembre.

Features

Centro features Mercado Municipal Río Cuale and Rosita Beach. The district has many landmarks, including the Church of Our Lady of Guadalupe, Los Arcos, the Malecón and its many sculptures, Plaza de Armas, and Presidencia Municipal de Puerto Vallarta.

Public art
Sculptures along the Malecón include The Boy on the Seahorse by Rafael Zamarripa, Erizados (2006), the Friendship Fountain (1987), The Good Fortune Unicorn, In Search of Reason (2000) by Sergio Bustamante, Millennium (2001), Nature as Mother, Nostalgia (1984), Origin and Destination (2011), Rain, The Rotunda by the Sea (1996) by Alejandro Colunga, the statue of Paschal Baylón, The Subtle Stone Eater  (2006), Tritón y Sirena (1990), and Vallarta Dancers by Jim Demetro. Previously, the statue of Lorena Ochoa (2012) was also installed along the Malecón. Plaza de Armas has a statue of Ignacio Vallarta.

References

 
Geography of Jalisco